Bruce "Butch" Gillespie (born 1946) is an American politician. He is a Republican representing the 9th district in the Montana State Senate.

Political career 

In 2018, former 9th district Montana State Senator, Llew Jones, was unable to run for re-election due to term limits. Gillespie ran for the open seat, won the Republican primary with 68.7% of the vote, and went on to win the general election with 73.2% of the vote.

As of June 2020, Gillespie sits on the following committees:
 Natural Resources
 Taxation
 Agriculture, Livestock, and Irrigation

Electoral record

Personal life 

Gillespie was born in Kevin, Montana in 1946. He went to high school in Sunburst, Montana, and holds a Bachelor of Arts in Agriculture Business and Range Management from Montana State University. Gillespie served two years in the Peace Corps in Ecuador.

References 

Living people
People from Toole County, Montana
Montana State University alumni
21st-century American politicians
Republican Party Montana state senators
1946 births